Jerome "Jay-Jay" Ramatlhakwana (born 29 May 1985) is a Motswana professional footballer who currently plays for Township Rollers as a striker.

Club career
Born in Lobatse, Ramatlhakwana has played in Botswana for Mogoditshane Fighters and Mochudi Centre Chiefs, in Cyprus for APOP Kinyras Peyias, and in South Africa for Santos and Vasco da Gama. In January 2013 signed for  Mochudi Centre Chiefs.

Ramatlhakwana was meant to move from Santos to Vasco da Gama in the summer of 2010, but a transfer fee wasn't agreed until January 2011. After his work permit was initially denied, Ramatlhakwane didn't sign for Vasco da Gama until April 2011; he scored on his debut.

International career
Ramatlhakwane scored on his senior debut for Botswana in a 1–0 win over Swaziland in November 2006, and has appeared in FIFA World Cup qualifying matches.

Ramatlhakwane led Botswana in scoring with five goals in qualifying for the 2012 African Cup of Nations. His fifth goal came on 26 March 2011 in N'Djamena, Chad as Botswana won 1-0 and became the first nation aside from the co-hosts to qualify for the 2012 African Cup of Nations, as Botswana would play in its first ever major tournament.

He scored four goals at the 2013 COSAFA Cup, including a hat-trick against Lesotho, as Botswana failed to get out of the group stage.  Those goals were enough to earn him the tournament's golden boot award.  It also took his international tally to 17, surpassing the record of 16 goals held by Dipsy Selolwane.

International goals
Scores and results list Botswana's goal tally first.

Honours
National team
Winners: 2008 Swaziland Four Nations Tournament

References

1985 births
Living people
Association football forwards
Botswana footballers
Botswana expatriate footballers
Botswana expatriates in South Africa
Botswana international footballers
Cypriot First Division players
Mogoditshane Fighters players
Mochudi Centre Chiefs SC players
Santos F.C. (South Africa) players
Expatriate footballers in Cyprus
Expatriate soccer players in South Africa
APOP Kinyras FC players
Vasco da Gama (South Africa) players
township Rollers F.C. players
Thanda Royal Zulu F.C. players
2012 Africa Cup of Nations players
CS Don Bosco players
Expatriate footballers in the Democratic Republic of the Congo